Leiodinae is a subfamily of round fungus beetles in the family Leiodidae. There are more than 60 genera and 1,800 described species in Leiodinae.

Genera
These 65 genera belong to the subfamily Leiodinae:

 Tribe Agathidiini Westwood, 1838
 Afroagathidium Angelini & Peck, 1984
 Agathidium Panzer, 1797
 Amphicyllis Erichson, 1845
 Anisotoma Panzer, 1797
 Besuchetionella Angelini & Peck, 2000
 Cyrtoplastus Reitter, 1885
 Decuria Miller & Wheeler, 2004
 Gelae Miller & Wheeler, 2005
 Liodopria Reitter, 1909
 Pseudoagathidium Angelini, 1993
 Stetholiodes Fall, 1910
 Tribe Estadiini Portevin, 1914
 Dietta Sharp, 1876
 Tribe Leiodini Fleming, 1821
 Afrocyrtusa Daffner, 1990
 Afroleiodes Peck, 2003
 Anogdus LeConte, 1866
 Chobautiella Reitter, 1900
 Cyrtusa Erichson, 1842
 Cyrtusamorpha Daffner, 1983
 Cyrtusoma Daffner, 1982
 Ecarinosphaerula Hatch, 1929
 Hypoliodes Portevin, 1908
 Incacyrtusa Daffner, 1990
 Isoplastus Horn, 1880
 Leiodes Latreille, 1797
 Liocyrtusa Daffner, 1982
 Lionothus W.J.Brown, 1937
 Ovocyrtusa Daffner, 1985
 Parvocyrtusa Peck & Cook, 2014
 Pseudolionothus Peck & Cook, 2014
 Xanthosphaera Fairmaire, 1859
 Zeadolopus Broun, 1903
 Tribe Pseudoliodini Portevin, 1926
 Agaricophagus Schmidt 1841
 Allocolenisia Daffner, 1990
 Ansibaris Reitter, 1883
 Cainosternum Notman, 1921
 Colenis Erichson, 1842
 Colenisia Fauvel, 1903
 Dermatohomoeus Hlisnikovský, 1963
 Neohydnobius Jeannel, 1962
 Pseudcolenis Reitter, 1884
 Zelodes Leschen, 2000
 †Mesagyrtoides Perkovsky, 1999
 †Tafforeus Perreau, 2012
 Tribe Scotocryptini Reitter, 1884
 Aglyptinus Cockerell, 1906
 Creagrophorus Matthews, 1887
 Cyrtusiola Elisnikovsky, 1974
 Parabystus Portevin, 1907
 Popeus Hlisnikovsky, 1974
 Scotocryptodes Portevin, 1907
 Scotocryptus Girard, 1874
 Synaristus Portevin, 1907
 Termitoglobus Reichensperger, 1915
 Tribe Sogdini Lopatin, 1961
 Anaballetus Newton, Svec & Fikacek
 Euliodes Portevin, 1937
 Hinomoto Hoshina, 2002
 Hydnobius Schmidt, 1841
 Hydnodiaetus Jeannel, 1962
 Isocolon Broun, 1893
 Kalohydnobius Peck & Cook, 2009
 Macrohydnobius Peck & Cook, 2009
 Metahydnobius Portevin, 1942
 Platyhydnobius Peck & Cook, 2009
 Pseudotriarthron Normand, 1938
 Sogda Lopatin, 1961
 Triarthron Märkel, 1840

References

Further reading

 

Leiodidae